Shahar Telpa Panchayat is a village in Karpi Block in Arwal District in the Indian state of Bihar. It belongs to the Magadh Division. It is located 14 km south from the District headquarters in Arwal. It is 9 km from Karpi and 83 km from the state capital Patna.

The panchayat is surrounded by Arwal Block in the north, Haspura Block in the west and Goh Block in the south.

Shahar Telpa borders the Arwal and Jehanabad districts. Jehanabad District, Ratni Faridpur, is in the east. It lies on the border of Patna.

Demographics
Bhojpuri and Magahi are the local languages.

Access
No railway station is with 10 km of Shahar Telpa Panchayat. The closest major station is Jehanabad Railway Station, 38 km away.

Nearest cities
 Daudnagar - 21 km near Shahar Telpa Panchayat 
 Makhdumpur - 36 km near Shahar Telpa Panchayat      
 Jehanabad - 37 km near Shahar Telpa Panchayat      
 Piro - 37 km near Shahar Telpa Panchayat

Nearby taluks
 Karpi - 8 km       
 Arwal - 14 km      
 Haspura - 15 km      
 Sahar - 15 km

Nearby airports
 Gaya Airport - 57 km      
 Patna Airport - 75 km      
 Varanasi Airport - 207 km     
 Ranchi Airport - 237 km

Nearby tourist places
 Bodh Gaya - 64 km from Shahar Telpa Panchayat     
 Sasaram - 75 km from Shahar Telpa Panchayat      
 Patna - 81 km from Shahar Telpa Panchayat       
 Golghar - 81 km from Shahar Telpa Panchayat      
 Takht Sri Patna Sahib - 82 km from Shahar Telpa Panchayat
 Devkund mandir -6 km from  Shahar Telpa Panchayat
 Baba Harkhu Nath Kund & temple Shahar telpa dih -1 km from Shahar Telpa Panchayat
 devi sthan shahar telpa dih -1 km from Shahar Telpa Panchayat
 Dev Surya mandir Aurangabad  -58 km from Shahar Telpa Panchayat
 Belsaar Surya mandir- 11 km from Shahar Telpa Panchayat
 Masarwa temple-12 km from Shahar Telpa Panchayat
 Maa Tara temple kespa -35 km from Shahar Telpa Panchayat

Nearby districts
 Arwal - 14 km from Shahar Telpa Panchayat      
 Jehanabad - 38 km from Shahar Telpa Panchayat      
 Bhojpur - 53 km from Shahar Telpa Panchayat      
 Gaya - 56 km from Shahar Telpa Panchayat

Schools in Shahar Telpa Panchayat
  Bhagwat High School, Bantara Road Shahar Telpa, Karpi, Arwal-19
  Middle School Telpa, Shahar telpa, Karpi Arwal-19

Colleges near Shahar Telpa Panchayat
 Aps P.g & B.ed Institute Kinjer, Kurtha More Kinjer
 R.P.S Evening College Kinjer, Kinjer Arwal
 S.D.S College Kaler

References

External links 
Raj Enterprises Shahar Telpa on Google 

  

Villages in Arwal district